Victor DeGrate, Jr. (born February 8, 1985) is a former American football defensive end. He was signed by the Houston Texans as an undrafted free agent in 2007. He played college football at Oklahoma State.

DeGrate was also member of the Detroit Lions and Cincinnati Bengals.

External links
Cincinnati Bengals bio
Oklahoma State Cowboys bio

1985 births
Living people
American football defensive ends
People from DeSoto, Texas
Players of American football from Texas
Oklahoma State Cowboys football players
Houston Texans players
Detroit Lions players
Cincinnati Bengals players
Tulsa Talons players
San Antonio Talons players
Sportspeople from the Dallas–Fort Worth metroplex